Joseph Michael Mazza Sr. (May 8, 1905 – July 18, 1993) was an American politician who served 12 years in the Vermont House of Representatives. He was succeeded by his son, Richard.

References

External links

1905 births
1993 deaths
20th-century American politicians
Democratic Party members of the Vermont House of Representatives
People from Colchester, Vermont